Engedal is a surname. Notable people with the surname include:

Knud Engedal (born 1942), Danish footballer
Lars Martin Engedal (born 1983), Norwegian footballer
Svend Engedal (1928–2001), Danish-born American soccer player

Surnames of Scandinavian origin